The 2018–19 Bucknell Bison men's basketball team represented Bucknell University during the 2018–19 NCAA Division I men's basketball season. The Bison, led by fourth-year head coach Nathan Davis, played their home games at Sojka Pavilion in Lewisburg, Pennsylvania as members of the Patriot League. They finished the season 21–12, 13–5 to earn a share of the regular season Patriot League championship. As the No. 2 seed in the Patriot League tournament, they defeated Holy Cross and Lehigh before losing to Colgate in the championship game. They were not selected for postseason play.

Previous season
The Bison finished the 2017–18 season 25–10, 16–2 in Patriot League to win the Patriot League regular season championship. They defeated Loyola (MD), Boston University, and Colgate to win the Patriot League tournament championship. As a result, they received the Patriot League's automatic bid to the NCAA tournament where they lost in the first round to Michigan State.

Offseason

Departures

2018 recruiting class

2019 recruiting class

Roster

Schedule and results

|-
!colspan=9 style=| Non-conference regular season

|-
!colspan=9 style=| Patriot League regular season

|-
!colspan=9 style=| Patriot League tournament

Source

References

Bucknell Bison men's basketball seasons
Bucknell
Bucknell
Bucknell